The 2002 Country Music Association Awards, 36th Ceremony, was held on November 6, 2002 at the Grand Ole Opry House, Nashville, Tennessee, and hosted by CMA Award Winner, Vince Gill. Alan Jackson lead the night with 10 nominations, including Album of the Year, and Entertainer of the Year.

References 

Country Music Association
CMA
Country Music Association Awards
Country Music Association Awards
November 2002 events in the United States
2002 awards in the United States
21st century in Nashville, Tennessee
Events in Nashville, Tennessee